The following lists events that happened during 1965 in Cape Verde.

Incumbents
Colonial governor: Leão Maria Tavares Rosado do Sacramento Monteiro

Sports
Académica da Praia won the Cape Verdean Football Championship

References

 
1965 in the Portuguese Empire
Years of the 20th century in Cape Verde
1960s in Cape Verde
Cape Verde
Cape Verde